The 2013 Li Na tennis season officially began on 31 December with the start of the 2013 WTA Tour at the first edition of the 2013 Shenzhen Open.

Yearly summary

Early hard court season and Australian Open

Shenzhen Open
Li Na started her season strongly by participating the inaugural Shenzhen Open in her home country. Defeating Mandy Minella, Julia Cohen, Bojana Jovanovski and country woman Peng Shuai en route, Li advanced to her first final of the year against fifth seed Klára Zakopalová. After splitting the first two sets, the deciding set was a tight affair, but Li broke her opponent's last service game to win the match. It was Li's first title of the year and seventh overall.

Apia International
Li then competed in Sydney in preparation for the Australian Open. On her road to the semifinals, Li defeated rising star Christina McHale, qualifier Ayumi Morita and another American prodigy Madison Keys, amassing a perfect 8–0 this season. In the semifinal Li faced Agnieszka Radwańska and went on to lose in straight sets. Radwańska later won the title.

Australian Open
Entering the first Grand Slam of the year, Li defeated young players Sesil Karatantcheva, Olga Govortsova, Sorana Cîrstea and Julia Görges en route to set up a quarter final match between her tour rivalry and friend Agnieszka Radwańska. Li took full advantage of her well-rounded performance, ending the Pole's Australian run in straight sets. In the semifinals, world No. 2 Maria Sharapova won only 4 games in a lopsided victory for Li. This would be Li's third Major final in her career .

Li's opponent in the final was defending champion Victoria Azarenka. The pair entered the final with 1 Major victory each. Li won the first set but fell twice in the second set. She twisted her left ankle and also hit her head on the court. Li, though injured, continued the match and was defeated by Azarenka in three sets. Li received a huge applause from the audience while giving her speech in the ceremony later that night.

Because of her left ankle injury, Li withdrew from 2013 Qatar Total Open, 2013 Dubai Tennis Championships and 2013 BNP Paribas Open. She continued her season in 2013 Sony Open Tennis in March.

Sony Open Tennis
After not participating any tour events for 2 months, Li returned to the American hard court season in Miami. As the fifth seed of the event

Clay court season and French Open

Porsche Tennis Grand Prix

Mutua Madrid Open

Internazionali BNL d'Italia

French Open

Grass court season and Wimbledon

Aegon International

Wimbledon

US Open Series and US Open

Rogers Cup

In her first match since Wimbledon, she beat Anastasia Pavlyuchenkova in two easy sets. In the third round Li faced Ana Ivanovic. The two traded sets but in the final set in went to a tiebreak, and Li earned a hard-fought victory. Li then defeated Dominika Cibulková and proceeded to the semifinal where she lost to Sorana Cîrstea in two sets.

Western & Southern Open

Li was the defending champion, and went on to make the semifinals. She lost to Serena Williams, 7–5 7–5, and double faulted to lose both sets.

US Open

Asian hard court season and Year-end Championships

China Open

WTA Championships
Li was drawn in the White group along with Victoria Azarenka, Sara Errani and Jelena Janković. She opened her campaign with a straight set win over Errani, improving to 6–0 in career head-to-head meetings against her. She was behind 3–1 in the second set before winning the next four games. She twice served for the match, wasting a match point at 5–3, and dropped serve on both occasions. Trailing 3–1 in the tiebreaker, Li won the next five points and converted her third match point when Errani dumped a forehand into the net. She emerged victorious against Janković in three topsy-turvy sets. In her final round robin match against Azarenka, she stormed out to a 4–2 lead before Azarenka suffered a lower back injury, allowing Li to win in two easy sets. She finished the match with an impressive +20 winner to error differential (28 to 8). The win meant she advanced to the semifinals for the first time with a 3–0 round robin record. She secured a career-high ranking of world No. 3 by besting Petra Kvitová in the semifinals, the highest ranking an Asian player, male or female, has ever achieved. In the final she made a strong start, blasting 10 winners en route to winning the first set against Serena Williams, but ran out of gas at 3–3 in the second set, losing nine games in a row to lose the championship.

All matches

Singles matches

Tournament schedule

Singles schedule
Li Na's 2013 singles tournament schedule is as follows:

Yearly records

Head-to-head matchups
Bold indicates that the player was in the Top 10, italics denotes that the player was in the Top 20 (at the time of the match being played). This list is ordered by number of wins to number of losses in chronological order played.

  Klára Zakopalová 2–0
  Olga Govortsova 2–0
  Bojana Jovanovski 2–0
  Jelena Janković 2–1
  Petra Kvitová 2–1
  Christina McHale 1–0
  Mandy Minella 1–0
  Julia Cohen 1–0
  Peng Shuai 1–0
  Ayumi Morita 1–0
  Sesil Karatantcheva 1–0
  Julia Görges 1–0
  Kiki Bertens 1–0
  Varvara Lepchenko 1–0
  Garbiñe Muguruza 1–0
  Mirjana Lučić-Baroni 1–0
  Zheng Jie 1–0
  Anabel Medina Garrigues 1–0
  Alizé Cornet 1–0
  Michaëlla Krajicek 1–0
  Simona Halep 1–0
  Roberta Vinci 1–0
  Anastasia Pavlyuchenkova 1–0
  Ana Ivanovic 1–0
  Dominika Cibulková 1–0
  Lauren Davis 1–0
  Angelique Kerber 1–0
  Sofia Arvidsson 1–0
  Laura Robson 1–0
  Ekaterina Makarova 1–0
  Daniela Hantuchová 1–0
  Sabine Lisicki 1–0
  Sara Errani 1–0
  Victoria Azarenka 1–1
  Madison Keys 1–1
  Sorana Cîrstea 1–1
  Maria Sharapova 1–1
  Bethanie Mattek-Sands 1–1
  Agnieszka Radwańska 1–2
  Elena Vesnina 0–1
  Serena Williams 0–4

Finals

Singles: 4 (1–3)

Earnings

 Figures in United States dollars (USD) unless noted.

See also
 2013 Victoria Azarenka tennis season
 2013 Serena Williams tennis season
 2013 WTA Tour

References

Li tennis season
Li Na tennis seasons
2013 in Chinese tennis